The Montfield Hospital is a health facility in the burgh of Lerwick, Shetland, Scotland. It is managed by NHS Shetland.

History
The facility, which was designed by P. Thompson, was opened as the Zetland County Sanatorium in November 1928. After joining the National Health Service in 1948, it was renamed Montfield Hospital in 1962 and was converted into a geriatric facility in 1983. A small care home was established on the ground floor in 2010. Following a public consultation in June 2011, NHS Shetland formally closed Montfield hospital in November 2011. The headquarters of the NHS Shetland Board, which had previously been based at Brevik House in Lerwick, was established on the upper floor in 2013.

References 

Hospital buildings completed in 1928
NHS Shetland
Hospitals in Shetland
NHS Scotland hospitals
1928 establishments in Scotland
Hospitals established in 1928
Lerwick